An abadi is a term often used in Persian to describe a rural location, typically a settlement in a rural environment, or informally as a town or city. The word Abadi derives from "", which translates to "populous, thriving, prosperous".

Being a generic and ambiguous term referring to small settlements, the statistical center of Iran uses the term in a broader sense, either a village, farm and "site" such as gas stations, restaurants, mines, railway stations, etc. As of the 1973 census 23 percent of ābādīs are non-residential.

References

See also 
 Oikonyms in Western and South Asia

Types of populated places